Kenny Sinclair (born 28 July 1975 in Irvine, Scotland) is a former Scottish international Sevens rugby union player who played for Glasgow Warriors at the Scrum-half position.

Taking up rugby union at Marr College, Sinclair then progressed to play for Marr RFC before moving to play for Kilmarnock RFC in 1995. In 1999 he joined Glasgow Hawks and played there for 3 seasons.

He played for Glasgow District.

He was called up to Glasgow Warriors late in season 2000-01, coming on for Barry Irving in the 48th minute against Swansea RFC in Glasgow's final Welsh-Scottish League match of the season. He was  still a Hawks player. After playing for the Warriors, Sinclair went back to playing for the Hawks.

He was capped for Scotland A in 2002 against Ireland Wolfhounds. He was also capped for the Scotland 7s side the same year, at Manchester's Commonwealth Games.

Sinclair is an electrician to trade and currently works in Edinburgh.

External links
Pro12 Profile

References

1975 births
Living people
Scottish rugby union players
Glasgow Warriors players
Glasgow District (rugby union) players
Marr RFC players
Kilmarnock RFC players
Glasgow Hawks players
Rugby union players from Irvine, North Ayrshire
Scotland 'A' international rugby union players
Scotland international rugby sevens players
Male rugby sevens players